Perry is an unincorporated community in Red Willow County, Nebraska, United States.

History
Perry was originally called Campbell, and under the latter name was established when the railroad was extended to that point.

References

Unincorporated communities in Red Willow County, Nebraska
Unincorporated communities in Nebraska